Charlesburg (also Charlesburgh) is an unincorporated community in the town of Brothertown in Calumet County, Wisconsin, United States.

History
Charlesburg was settled in 1855. The first settler was probably Anton Reinl, an immigrant from Bohemia which was then part of Austrian Empire. Other early settlers were Raymond Lodes, Joseph Nadler, and Joseph Fisher. They spoke a dialect of German.

One of the landmarks in the community is its Catholic Church, called St. Charles Church. It opened in 1866 and closed in 2005.

Location
Charlesburg is located on St. Charles Road at its intersection with Washington Road. It is considered part of the Holyland region in southern Calumet County.

Notable residents
Aloysius Leitner, military
William Morgan, Wisconsin Attorney General

Images

References

Unincorporated communities in Calumet County, Wisconsin
Unincorporated communities in Wisconsin